Mijić is a surname. Notable people with the surname include:

Ana Mijic, Serbian hydrologist
Dušan Mijić (born 1965), Bosnian Serb football coach and player
Karlo Mijić (1887–1964), Yugoslav painter
Miloš Mijić (born 1989), Serbian football player
Predrag Mijić (born 1984), Serbian footballer 
Snježana Mijić (born 1971), Croatian volleyball player
Vasa Mijić (born 1973), Serbian volleyball player